Eiichi Tajima (田嶋栄一 - Tajima Eiichi; born December 3, 1967) is a Japanese professional racing driver.

Complete JGTC/Super GT Results 
(key) (Races in bold indicate pole position) (Races in italics indicate fastest lap)

References 

1967 births
Living people
People from Tokyo
Japanese racing drivers
Japanese Formula 3 Championship drivers
Super GT drivers